Track of Words is a 1999 solo album by singer-songwriter Steve Knightley.

A lost album of sorts, which was re-recorded by Knightley and co-producer/engineer Mark Tucker. The re-recorded album was released as Track of Words – Retraced in 2009. Retraced was included in Mike Ganley's Crooked Road "Top 10 Albums 2009" list.

Track listing
All songs written by Steve Knightley, except where noted.

"Ahh! (Running Away)" – 4:10
"You're Mine" – 4:26
"Rush Of Blood" (Knightley/Matt Clifford) – 3:51
"Castaway" (Knightley/Clifford) – 4:05
"Track Of Words" – 3:46
"Faith In You" – 2:54
"The Cold Heart Of England" – 3:53
"Don't Look Now" – 4:14
"Face In The Frame" – 3:50
"It Wasn't You" – 3:36
"Caught In The Rain" (Knightley/Clifford) – 4:05
"Pain Away" – 3:55
"Broken" – 6:17

Personnel
 Steve Knightley – lead vocals, acoustic guitar, cello-mandolin
 Matt Clifford – keyboards, percussion, and all other noises, backing vocals on track 11
 Paul Wassif – acoustic and electric guitars, dobro on tracks 7 and 10
 Polly Bolton – backing vocals on tracks 2 and 11

References

External links
 http://www.themarktucker.co.uk

1999 albums
Steve Knightley albums